Pär Johan Zetterberg (born 14 October 1970) is a Swedish former professional footballer who played as a midfielder. He is best remembered for his time with R.S.C. Anderlecht, but also represented Falkenbergs FF, Charleroi, and Olympiacos during a career that spanned between 1986 and 2006. A full international between 1993 and 1999, he won 30 caps for the Sweden national team and scored six goals. He was awarded Guldbollen in 1997 as Sweden's best footballer of the year.

Club career 
Zetterberg started off his footballing career with Falkenbergs FF in 1978, and made his senior debut for the team in Division 3 at the age of 15 in 1986. After having played seven games for Falkenberg, he joined Anderlecht as a youth player later in the same year. He made his debut for Anderlecht in the Belgian First Division in 1989 and had a loan spell at Charleroi between 1991 and 1993. He stayed with Anderlecht until the year 2000 and helped the team to four league titles during this time.

In 2000, Zetterberg joined Olympiacos in the Greek Superleague and helped the team to three straight league titles between 2000 and 2003. He returned to Anderlecht in 2003 and helped the team to another two league titles before retiring from professional football in 2006.

He appeared in around 300 games for Anderlecht during his two spells with the team.

International career 
Zetterberg represented the Sweden U17 and U21 teams a total of 12 times, scoring two goals.

He made his full international debut for Sweden on 19 May 1993 in a 1994 FIFA World Cup qualifier against Austria, replacing Johnny Ekström in the 70th minute of a 1–0 win. He scored his first senior goal for Sweden two weeks later on 2 June 1993 in a 1994 FIFA World Cup qualifier against Israel, scoring the third goal in 5–0 win. Zetterberg helped Sweden qualify for the 1994 FIFA World Cup, but missed out on the tournament because of a serious knee injury.

He played in the qualification campaigns for UEFA Euro 1996 and the 1998 FIFA World Cup, but could not help Sweden qualify for the two tournaments despite scoring a total of three goals during the latter campaign.

Zetterberg had a falling out with the national team manager Tommy Söderberg in 1999, and declared that he would not return to the Sweden national team until Söderberg no longer managed the team. He would play his last ever international game for Sweden in a 1–0 UEFA Euro 2000 qualifying win against Luxembourg at the age of 28. Zetterberg won a total of 30 caps during his career, scoring six goals.

Coaching career 
On 21 March 2020, Zetterberg left RSC Anderlecht as assistant manager after a two year stint.

Personal life 
Zetterberg suffers from diabetes type 1. He is the father of professional footballer Erik Zetterberg.

Career statistics

Club

International 

Scores and results list Sweden's goal tally first, score column indicates score after each Zetterberg goal.

Honours 
Anderlecht Belgian First Division: 1990–91, 1993–94, 1994–95, 1999–00, 2003–04, 2005–06
 Belgian Cup: 1993–94
 Belgian League Cup: 2000
 Belgian Sports Team of the Year: 2000Olympiacos Super League Greece: 2000–01, 2001–02, 2002–03Individual'''
 Belgian Golden Shoe: 1993, 1997
 Belgian Professional Footballer of the Year: 1993, 1997, 1998
 Man of the Season (Belgian First Division): 1996–97
 Swedish Golden Ball: 1997
 Belgian Fair Play Award: 1998, 1999, 2000, 2004, 2005, 2006
Platina Eleven (Best Team in 50 Years of Golden Shoe Winners) (2003)
 The Best Golden Shoe Team Ever (2011)

References

1970 births
Living people
Swedish footballers
Association football midfielders
Sweden international footballers
Belgian Pro League players
Falkenbergs FF players
R.S.C. Anderlecht players
R. Charleroi S.C. players
Olympiacos F.C. players
People from Falkenberg
Swedish expatriate sportspeople in Belgium
Expatriate footballers in Belgium
Swedish expatriate sportspeople in Greece
Expatriate footballers in Greece
People with type 1 diabetes
Sportspeople from Halland County